Karl Johan "Kallen" Johannessen (born 28 April 1943) is a retired Norwegian football striker.

He played for SK Herd before transferring to Lyn in the summer of 1967. He had a good scoring rate in 1967, and also notably scored 4 goals in 6 games in the 1968–69 European Cup Winners' Cup. He also got the chance to represent Norway once.

In 1970 he returned to SK Herd, then he went on to Aalesunds FK in 1971, Skarbøvik IF in 1972, Aalesund again in 1974, and Molde FK in 1976.

References

External links
 

1943 births
Living people
Sportspeople from Ålesund
Norwegian footballers
Lyn Fotball players
Aalesunds FK players
Molde FK players
Association football forwards